Elections to Newport City Council were held on 1 May 2008 along with elections to the other 21 local authorities in Wales, community council elections in Wales and 2008 United Kingdom local elections.

Councillors elected in this election serve a four-year term.

The previous election took place in 2004.

The next full election took place on 3 May 2012.

Election results: overview 

|-bgcolor=#F6F6F6
| colspan=2 style="text-align: right; margin-right: 1em" | Total
| style="text-align: right;" | 50
| colspan=5 |
| style="text-align: right;" |  41,640 
| style="text-align: right;" | 
|-
|}

 The Independent statistics are for all Independents, whether they are members of the Independent group on the council or not.

Ward results

Allt-yr-yn

Alway

Beechwood

Bettws

Caerleon

Gaer

Graig

Langstone

Liswerry

Llanwern

Malpas

Marshfield

Pillgwenlly

Ringland

Rogerstone

St Julians

Shaftesbury

Stow Hill

Tredegar Park

Victoria

References

Newport
2008